The Catholic Church in Cyprus is part of the worldwide Catholic Church, under the spiritual leadership of the Pope in Rome.

Description
There are around 10,000 Catholic faithful in Cyprus, corresponding to just over 1% of the total population. Most Catholic worshippers are either Maronite Cypriots, under the pastoral care of Joseph Soueif, Archeparch of the Maronite Catholic Archeparchy of Cyprus, or Latins, under the pastoral care of the Latin Patriarch of Jerusalem, with a Patriarchal Vicar General. The Roman catholic community of Cyprus (Latinoi, Λατίνοι) is of the three recognised religious minorities of Cyprus, together with the Armenians and Maronites, according to the 1960 constitution, and is represented in the Cypriot parliament.

The Latin Patriarchal Vicariate for Cyprus has four parishes:

 The Holy Cross church in Nicosia, with a dependent mission at the St. Elizabeth Catholic Church in Kyrenia, Northern Cyprus.
 The St. Mary of Graces Church in Larnaca.
 The St. Catherine Catholic Church in Limassol.
 The St. Paul Catholic Church in Paphos.
 
The Sisters of St. Bruno and Bethlehem have a small convent at Mesa Chorio served by the parish priest of Paphos. A recently constructed hospice provides palliative care, regardless of nationality or religious persuasion.

There is also a Catholic presence through chapels and chaplains serving British military personnel, staff and dependents in the Sovereign Base Areas of the island that were established in 1960.

Sacred sites in Cyprus

Many of the religious sites in Cyprus can be traced to early Byzantine foundations, built before the East-West Schism between Rome and Constantinople in the 11th century. Their architecture and iconography reveal a profound influence on ecclesial building traditions still in use in the Cypriot Orthodox Church. In the Middle Ages, Cyprus was ruled by a Frankish aristocracy, the Lusignan dynasty. They favoured the Gothic style when establishing cathedrals and monasteries. The former Catholic Augustinian Cloister of Bellapais near Kyrenia was transferred to Orthodox Church authorities when the Ottomans conquered Cyprus at the end of the 16th century. Other Gothic churches were converted to mosques, for example Saint Sophia Cathedral, now Selimiye Mosque (Nicosia), and Saint Nicholas Cathedral in Famagusta, now the Lala Mustafa Pasha Mosque.

References

External links
 The Latin Catholic Church of Cyprus
 The Maronite Eparchy of Cyprus
 The Holy Cross Church in Nicosia

 
Cyprus
Cyprus